Sililo Victor Martens (born 27 April 1977 in Auckland, New Zealand) is a former Tongan international rugby union player.

Career
Martens was born in Auckland, New Zealand to a Tongan mother and Australian father. He spent most of his early childhood in Tonga, but moved back to start his education. His high school years were spent at Onehunga High where he went on to play rugby for Auckland and continued through the grades to reach New Zealand Schools status. In 1999 he played for Tonga in the Rugby World Cup which led to a professional rugby contract with English premiership side Worcester. From 2000 to 2002 he played for Swansea in the Welsh Premiership. 2002 -2003 he joined fellow Welsh team Bridgend. During the 2003/2004 Martens joined the short lived Welsh regional side Celtic Warriors. He played is his second Rugby World Cup in 2003 for Tonga. 2004-2008 moved back to the English Premiership with Sale Sharks who went on to win the Guinness Premiership in 2006, to which Martens contributed 15 appearances. In 2008 he played in the Pacific Islands Team which toured the UK. The 2008/2009 season saw Martens return to Welsh rugby joining the Scarlets.

Martens retired at the early age of 34 to concentrate on various business ventures and currently lives in South Wales with his wife Anna Martens and their 4 children. His previous clubs include Worcester, Swansea, Bridgend, Celtic Warriors, Sale Sharks and the Scarlets.

Martens acted in the Welsh language soap opera Pobl y Cwm and went on to play a small role in the film Invictus along with fellow Tongan Epeli Taione.

References

External links

Tongan actors
1977 births
Living people
Rugby union scrum-halves
Sale Sharks players
Scarlets players
Worcester Warriors players
Tongan rugby union players
Tonga international rugby union players
Pacific Islanders rugby union players
Bridgend RFC players
Swansea RFC players
Tongan people of Australian descent
New Zealand sportspeople of Tongan descent
New Zealand people of Australian descent
Tongan expatriate rugby union players
Expatriate rugby union players in Wales
Expatriate rugby union players in England
Tongan expatriate sportspeople in England
New Zealand expatriate sportspeople in England
Tongan expatriate sportspeople in Wales
New Zealand expatriate sportspeople in Wales
People educated at Onehunga High School